is a Japanese voice actress from Kyoto Prefecture who is affiliated with Digital Double. She is known for her roles as Kasumi Nakasu in Love Live! Nijigasaki High School Idol Club and Ayaka Mizusawa in PuraOre! Pride of Orange.

Biography
Sagara was born in Kyoto Prefecture on April 17, 1995. She had an interest in anime from a young age and wanted to pursue a career as a voice actress by the time she was in her sixth year of elementary school. This desire was strengthened after watching the anime series Magical Girl Lyrical Nanoha and noticing that its lead cast members, Yukari Tamura and Nana Mizuki, performed the show's opening and ending themes. After graduating from high school she enrolled in a training school operated by the voice acting agency Pro-Fit; after completing her training, she became affiliated with the agency's subsidiary Link-Plan.

Sagara's first named voice acting role was as the character Mirai Kajiwara in the anime series Idol Memories. In 2017 she was cast as the character Kasumi Nakasu in Love Live! Nijigasaki High School Idol Club. In 2020 she voiced Moe Isurugi in Warlords of Sigrdrifa. That same year she left Link-Plan and transferred to talent agency Digital Double. In 2021 she played Ayaka Mizusawa in PuraOre! Pride of Orange.

Filmography

Anime
2015
World Break: Aria of Curse for a Holy Swordsman, Student

2016
Idol Memories, Mirai Kajiwara

2017
Idol Time PriPara, Chako

2019
Hensuki, Announcer
Kiratto Pri Chan, Yukari Daikuhara
Demon Lord, Retry!, Manami

2020
Love Live! Nijigasaki High School Idol Club, Kasumi Nakasu
Warlords of Sigrdrifa, Moe Isurugi

2021
Waccha PriMagi!, Miruki Amauri
PuraOre! Pride of Orange, Ayaka Mizusawa

2022
Love Live! Nijigasaki High School Idol Club 2nd Season, Kasumi Nakasu
Teppen!!!!!!!!!!!!!!! Laughing 'til You Cry, Kana Kiyotsuru
Aru Asa Dummy Head Mike ni Natteita Ore-kun no Jinsei, Ume Toranomon

2023
My Life as Inukai-san's Dog, Mike Nekotani

Video games
2019
Love Live! School Idol Festival All Stars, Kasumi Nakasu
2020
Higurashi No Naku Koro Ni Mei, Kazuho Kimiyoshi

References

External links
Official agency profile 

1995 births
Living people
Japanese video game actresses
Japanese voice actresses
Nijigasaki High School Idol Club members
Voice actresses from Kyoto Prefecture